Krzywda  is a village in the administrative district of Gmina Stara Błotnica, within Białobrzegi County, Masovian Voivodeship, in east-central Poland.

The village has a population of 320.

References

Villages in Białobrzegi County